Raiganj University  is a public state university in Raiganj, Uttar Dinajpur district, West Bengal, India. It is the oldest higher educational institution in the North Dinajpur district. This institution was elevated to the status of a public state university on 3 February 2015 by an Act of the West Bengal legislature  after functioning as a constituent college of the University of North Bengal for a long time. This university offers undergraduate, postgraduate, and doctoral level courses in liberal arts.

History
With the partition of India based on the religious line, many people came over to the border district erstwhile West Dinajpur and Raiganj provided many of them with food and shelter. The education of their children was a necessity for these uprooted people to change their fortune. At this point in time, few educationalists and social thinkers of this small town felt the necessity of building a college for higher education in this backward region. Late Sukumar Guha and Late Nirmal Chandra Ghosh played a very important role at this time. Because of their effort, a meeting was organized among the local eminent and interested persons to establish a college for higher education. Everyone in this meeting unanimously decided to establish a college for higher education and appealed to the peoples to donate land and money for this purpose. The college was then formally opened in 1948 as an affiliated college of the University of Calcutta.

With the establishment of the University of North Bengal in the year 1962 at the northern part of West Bengal, the affiliation of the college changed from the University of Calcutta to the University of North Bengal. Different Honours degree courses were introduced gradually. In the year 1968, University of North Bengal took the decision to take over the Raiganj College as a university college with all its assets and liabilities. Subsequently, the name of the Raiganj College was changed to Raiganj College (University College).

In the year 2013, the chief minister of the West Bengal (Mamata Banerjee) came to the Raiganj town for an administrative meeting and announced that Raiganj College (University College) will be upgraded to a full-fledged university. Later the university was established on 3 February 2015 as per the Raiganj University Act.

Campus and Location
Raiganj University is located in the heart of Raiganj town, the district headquarter of Uttar Dinajpur. It currently has only one permanent campus. Area of main campus is 25 acres.

Organisation and Administration

Governance
The Vice-chancellor of Raiganj University is the chief executive officer of the university. Anil Bhuimali is the current Vice-chancellor of the university.

Faculties and Departments
Raiganj University has 22 departments organized into two faculties.

 Faculty of Science and Management

This faculty consists of the departments of Mathematics, Physics, Chemistry, Computer & Information Science, Statistics, Microbiology, Sericulture, Botany, Zoology, and Management (Business Administration).

 Faculty of Arts, Commerce & Law

This faculty consists of the departments of Bengali, English, Sanskrit, History, Political Science, Philosophy, Economics, Education, Geography, Sociology, Commerce, and Law.

Academics

Admission
The university follows the government policy for admission. Pass in the higher secondary (10+2) examination is necessary for admission to the undergraduate courses of the Raiganj University. For admission in the doctoral and postgraduate level courses, one has to take an entrance examination either conducted by the university or by the national agency like CSIR, UGC etc.

Accreditation
Raiganj University is recognized under Section 2(f) and 12(B) of the UGC Act.

Notable alumni
 Priya Ranjan Dasmunsi, Indian Politician
 Nimai Chandra Saha, Indian academic

References

External links
Official website

 
Academic institutions formerly affiliated with the University of North Bengal
Educational institutions established in 1948
Universities and colleges in Uttar Dinajpur district
1948 establishments in West Bengal